The Punjabi Mexican American community, the majority of which is localized to Yuba City, California, is a distinctive ethnicity holding its roots in a migration pattern that occurred almost a century ago. The first meeting of these cultures occurred in the Imperial and Central Valleys in 1907, near the largest irrigation system in the Western Hemisphere.

Punjabi immigration

For decades in the early 20th century, Punjabi farming families sent their sons out of the Punjab to earn money. Intending to return to the Indian state of Punjab, only a handful of men brought their wives and families. In the United States, however, due to changed immigration laws it was not possible for the families of Punjabi workers to join them. Beyond this, poor wages and working conditions convinced the Punjabi workers to pool their resources, lease land and grow their own crops, thereby establishing themselves in the newly budding farming economy of northern California.

Mexican immigration

Almost one million Mexican immigrants began entering America in the 1910s, shortly after the Mexican Revolution, with a large percentage arriving in families. A small number of these families picked cotton in fields farmed by Punjabi men. The Punjabi men are thought to have chosen women of Mexican ancestry for many reasons. Mexican women were considered brown, as were the Punjabi men; interracial marriage bans in California prevented Punjabis from marrying Black or White women but allowed them to marry Mexican women. Mexican women, much like the women of Punjab, covered their heads and bodies to protect themselves from the blazing sun while working in the fields. Mexicans and Punjabis shared a rural way of life, with similar types of food and family values, and thus maintained a similar material and social culture. Mexicans and Indians shared an initially lower class status in American society.

Intermarriage
Punjabi men married Mexican women laborers and there were eventually almost four hundred of these biethnic couples clustered in California’s agricultural valleys. Although the majority of these intermarriages happened in northern-central California in the Central Valley, in areas such as Yuba City, Stockton, or Sacramento, Punjabi-Mexican marriages occurred as far away as New Mexico, Nevada, Utah, Arizona, or El Paso, Texas. Husbands and wives spoke to each other in rudimentary English or Spanish. The men tended to be older, in their late thirties or forties, and the women in their early twenties. Punjabi men learned Spanish to communicate with Mexican agricultural laborers and to speak to their wives. Some Punjabi men adopted Spanish names or nicknames: Miguel for Maghar, Andrés for Inder, and Mondo for Mohammed.

The aspects of Punjabi culture fathers transmitted to their wives and children included that of food and funerary practices. Cooking in the home drew from both Mexican and Punjabi cuisines and the men taught their wives to cook chicken curry, roti, and various vegetable curries. For example, the Rasul family in Yuba City ran the El Ranchero restaurant, the only Mexican restaurant in California (before closing in 1993) that featured chicken curry and roti. Another important retention of Punjabi culture was the disposition of the body upon death. The Hindus and Sikhs insisted upon cremation, then uncommon in North America, and Muslims carried out orthodox burial ceremonies for each other (though the plots in which they are buried in rural California have since been misnamed "Hindu plots"). The wives were buried in the Mexican Catholic section of local cemeteries, as were the children.

Notable people 
 Mike Mohamed (b. 1988), American football linebacker

See also

 Indian immigration to Mexico
 Asian Latin Americans
Other merged inter-ethnic/racial groups in North America
Cherokee Freedmen Controversy (African American Cherokees)
Chindians (of mixed Chinese and Indian ancestry)
Hapa (of commonly Native Hawaiian/Asian American descent)
Irish Quebecers (French speaking Canadians of Irish descent)
Métis (Native American/English or French descent)

References

Further reading

External links
Article on Punjabi-Mexicans

Indian-American culture in California
Mexican-American culture in California
Chicano
Indian diaspora in the United States
Pakistani diaspora in the United States
Indian American
Mexican American
Pakistani-American history
Central Valley (California)
Mexican